Wesley Thomas Kitchens is an American politician who serves in the Alabama House of Representatives, representing the 27th district since 2018. He is a member of the Republican Party.

References

1989 births
Republican Party members of the Alabama House of Representatives
Living people